Eugene Bordinat Jr. (February 10, 1920 – August 11, 1987) was a Ford Motor Company styling executive whose career spanned several decades.

Early career
Bordinat was educated at the Cranbrook Academy of Art and the University of Michigan.  He joined General Motors in 1939 as a trainee.  During World War II he was a supervisor at Fisher Body for tank production, and later served in the United States Army Air Forces.  Bordinat briefly returned to work at GM as a senior stylist after the war.

Ford career
Bordinat joined Ford in 1947, quitting General Motors. He supervised styling at the Lincoln-Mercury division, influencing the implementation of many automotive designs.  Bordinat was promoted to vice president for styling and a chief designer in 1961, the successor to George W. Walker.  He ultimately served 19 years, longer than anyone in Ford Styling before or since.  His favorite designs during his tenure included successful cars like the Ford Mustang and Lincoln Continental Mk III, as well as the Pinto. Bordinat was an enthusiast of the wire-wheels-and-stand-up-grilles school of design, as reflected in the Mark III and a number of other cars he styled. He retired from Ford in 1980 following his 60th birthday.

Personal life
Bordinat is quoted to have said "Beauty is a good 10-day sales report", a methodology that made him versatile and adaptive.  He was a member of the Industrial Designers Society of America from its founding in 1965.  In his retirement he wrote a light-hearted autobiography manuscript entitled My Days at the Court of Henry II. Though it had been finished and accepted, it was being edited at the time of his death to accommodate a more "anti-Iacocca slant" as suggested by the publisher and of which Bordinat approved.  Eugene Bordinat died suddenly of an undiagnosed lung ailment at the Henry Ford Hospital on August 11, 1987. Although his widow Teresa said that she would finish it, the work was never published.

References
 
 Archived New York Times obituary, retrieved July 24, 2008
 IDSA page on Eugene Bordinat, retrieved July 24, 2008

1920 births
1987 deaths
Ford executives
Cranbrook Academy of Art alumni
University of Michigan alumni
People in the automobile industry
United States Army Air Forces soldiers
United States Army Air Forces personnel of World War II